HIWIN is a major Taiwanese company which manufactures machinery components. It was founded in 1989 and is based in Taichung, Taiwan.

HIWIN is a combination of HI-tech WINner.

The company is known for linear motion guides, ball splines, and ball screws.

References

Taiwanese brands
Bearing manufacturers
Companies based in Taichung
Companies established in 1989
1989 establishments in Taiwan
Companies listed on the Taiwan Stock Exchange
Multinational companies headquartered in Taiwan